Meisjeshuis is a former children's home located at Albert Grisarstraat in Antwerp, Belgium. Throughout the years it has also been known as Adolf Stappaertsgasthuis and Algemeen Kinderziekenhuis Good-Engels.

The building 
The building of Meisjeshuis was designed in 1876 by architect Ernest Dieltiens. It consisted of a left wing, a central gatehouse and a right wing. The institute had four house numbers at Albert Grisarstraat, from number 17 to number 23. In total, the orphanage accommodated about 400 orphans. The children were divided into two departments: one for children over the age of five, and the other for children under five. The younger department was also known as Kinderkribbe Good Engels and was located in the right wing of the institute at number 23.

Second World War 
The history of the Jewish children of Meisjeshuis was researched by Reinier Heinsman, author of “From the Children's Home to the Gas Chamber: And how some avoided their fate.”  In September 1942, 39 Jewish orphans lived in Meisjeshuis. 25 of them were older than five, while the remaining 14 were younger than five. Only 13 of the 39 Jewish orphans of Meisjeshuis survived the war.

First raid 
 
On September 21, 1942, the German Sicherheitspolizei und Sicherheitsdienst (Sipo-SD) raided three Antwerp orphanages: Meisjeshuis, Pennsylvania Foundation and Jongenshuis. In Meisjeshuis, all 25 Jewish orphans who had already reached the age of five were arrested and taken to the Dossin barracks, the former transit camp in Mechelen. On September 26, 1942 these 25 orphans were deported. The entire group was gassed upon arrival in Auschwitz-Birkenau on September 28, 1942.

Rescue actions 
The youngest 14 Jewish children of Meisjeshuis had not been arrested during the raid on September 21, 1942. They were still staying at the department of Kinderkribbe Good Engels. Following a German order, the board of the orphanage was ordered ″not to allow the remaining Jewish children under 5 years of age, to be picked up by their parents or relatives and not to take in any more Jewish children.″  This order from the German Sipo-SD meant that the 14 remaining Jewish orphans could no longer leave the orphanage in the normal way. To circumvent this order, from September 21, 1942 to January 1943, a total of 10 of the 14 remaining Jewish children were rescued by the caregivers and hospitalized. They were taken to the Sint-Erasmus hospital in Borgerhout, where they all went into hiding. Werner Szydlow, one of the rescued children, described his stay in the hospital as follows:

Second raid 

On October 30, 1942, a second raid took place which targeted the Jewish orphans of Meisjeshuis. At the ward of Kinderkribbe Good Engels, 4 of the 14 orphans were arrested. The Nazis had taken note of the hospitalizations, and went to the Sint-Erasmus hospital to search for the hospitalized orphans. 3 of them were found and arrested in the hospital. The arrested orphans were taken to the Dossin barracks in Mechelen, where a major rescue operation, with the involvement of Yvonne Nèvejean and older Jewish orphans from the Jewish orphanage in Wezembeek (Belgium), saved them from deportation. Some of the rescuers were children themselves, including the then 14-year-old Leon Schipper, 10-year-old Marcel Chojnacki and 13-year-old Isabelle Pinkas Eisenman. 

Of the 14 Jewish orphans at the department of Kinderkribbe Good Engels, 13 survived the war. In January 2021, the still-living orphans were reunited through Zoom, among them retired pediatric neurologist Fred J. Kader and Neodance creator Alfred Friedman.

List of the murdered Jewish children of Meisjeshuis

References

External links
 Van het kindertehuis naar de gaskamer: 40 Antwerpse kinderen bleken niet veilig
 Brownstein: Holocaust child survivors reconnect seven decades after arriving in Montreal
 ‘Het loont nog altijd om te blijven zoeken’
 Orphaned in Holocaust, Belgian survivors reunite over 70 years later
 Holocaust Memorial Day: They were rescued from deportation. Now, Jewish orphans reunite.

Orphanages
The Holocaust in Belgium
Buildings and structures in Antwerp